Red Harvest is the second and final album by American metal band Bloodsimple, released on October 30, 2007. Will Hunt of the band Dark New Day played drums on the album. Frontman Tim Williams explained that the title of the album is based on the 1929 book of the same name by Dashiell Hammett.

The song "Dead Man Walking" was included on the soundtrack of the video game WWE SmackDown vs. Raw 2009.

Track listing

Personnel
Tim Williams - vocals
Mike Kennedy  -  guitar
Nick Rowe  -  guitar
Kyle Sanders - bass

Studio musicians
Will Hunt - drums

Touring musicians
Jacob Ward - drums

References

2007 albums
Bloodsimple albums
Albums produced by Machine (producer)